El Shaddai Records is an independent record label founded in late 2006 and based in Melbourne, Australia. Shortly after the label began they announced that they had signed post-hardcore band House Vs. Hurricane and rock/hardcore band Forgiven Rival, publishing numerous releases for both groups. In late 2009 El Shaddai Records continued on to sign deals with Antiskeptic, and US groups A Plea for Purging, and This Runs Through for the Australian releases of the bands' recordings. 2010 saw the Australian release of He Is Legend's It Hates You and To Speak of Wolves' Following Voices. In 2011 El Shaddai Records released the Blessed By A Broken Heart single Forever off their album Feel The Power which was released on the label 24 January 2012.

Current artists

Blessed By A Broken Heart
Antiskeptic
To Speak of Wolves
He Is Legend

Former artists

A Plea for Purging (Disbanded)
House Vs. Hurricane
Forgiven Rival
MxPx
This Runs Through (Disbanded)

El Shaddai Records releases

References

External links
Elshaddairecords.net Official site
Discography at Discogs
Discography at MusicBrainz

Australian independent record labels